Barra is an eastern quarter of Naples, southern Italy, with a population of some 40,000 inhabitants (38,103 in the 2001 census.)

Barra occupies the easternmost section of the Naples comune'''s territory, ranging from the sea to the Vesuvio's slopes, bounding with Poggioreale.

The area has suffered much the same fate of urban decay as the rest of the eastern periphery of Naples, a fate that includes drugs and entrenched organized crime.  Historically, it was one of the Vesuvian areas built up under the Bourbons in the 18th century and still displays some structures from that period that have been restored and incorporated into the tourist/cultural itinerary of "Vesuvian Villas". The area was heavily bombed in World War II.

Bibliography
 Pasquale Cozzolino, La Barra e sue origini, Napoli 1889.
 Nicola Lapegna, Origini e storia di Barra, Napoli 1929.
 Vittorio Gleijeses, La storia di Napoli, Napoli 1977.
 Cesare De Seta, I casali di Napoli, Bari 1984.
 Pompeo Centanni, Il nobile casale della Barra, Napoli 1997.
 Comune di Napoli - Assessorato all'Identità, cultura e promozione dell'immagine, Per una guida turistica di Barra, Napoli 1997/98.
 Pompeo Centanni, Angelo Renzi, La Repubblica Napoletana del 1799 e il casale della Barra, Edizioni Magna Graecia, Napoli 1999.
 Angelo Renzi, Barra (Ristampa e approfondimenti di due documenti sulla storia di Barra), Edizioni Magna Graecia, Napoli 1999.
 Raffaele Ciaravolo, La storia di Barra, Napoli 2000.
 Anna Ferrara, Le Chiese e le ville vesuviane di Barra, Edizioni Magna Graecia, Napoli 2000.
 Tommaso Lomonaco, Barra: da Comune a Circoscrizione, Edizioni Magna Graecia, Napoli 2004.
 Romano Marino, La sirena racconta, Napoli 2003.
 Romano Marino, Tradizionale Festa dei Gigli di Barra 1800-2000 Vol.I 1800-1954, Napoli 2004.
 Romano Marino, Le strade di Barra, Napoli 2004.
 Romano Marino, Tradizionale Festa dei Gigli di Barra 1800-2000 Vol.II 1955-2000, Napoli 2005.
 Raffaele Ciaravolo, Sirinum, Casabalera e Barra de' Coczis, Napoli 2006.
 Romano Marino, Cari paesani, Napoli 2007.
 Romano Marino, Barra da riscoprire e... altre storie, Napoli 2008.
 Romano Marino, Barra un Comune... dentro la città'', Napoli 2010

Quartieri of Naples
Former municipalities of the Province of Naples